The qualification phase for the 2011 African Championship of Nations began in March 2010. These games did not count towards the FIFA rankings.

The inaugural edition of the competition featured eight teams, while this edition featured sixteen.

Qualification Zones

Qualification was divided into the CAF Zoning system. Each Zone had either two or three teams that qualified for the final tournament.

North Zone

First round

|}

Tunisia and Algeria qualify for the final tournament.

Zone West A

Preliminary round

|}

Mauritania withdrew.

First round

|}

Mali and Senegal qualify for the final tournament.

Zone West B

|}

Ivory  coast, Ghana and Niger qualify for the final tournament.

Central Zone

Preliminary round

|}

Equatorial Guinea withdrew.

First round

|}

Cameroon and DR Congo qualify for the final tournament.

Second round

|}

 Congo withdrew. Match was awarded 3–0 to Gabon.

Gabon qualify for the final tournament.

Central-East Zone

Preliminary round

|}

There was only one leg played due to Somalia being unable to host international fixtures.

First round

|}

Ethiopia withdrew. Match was awarded 3–0 to Kenya.

Eritrea withdrew. Match was awarded 3–0 to Rwanda.

There was only one leg played due to Somalia being unable to host international fixtures.

Second round

The Tanzania vs Rwanda match was pushed forward to May 1 due to Rwanda’s hosting of the CECAFA Kagame Cup from 15–29 May.

|}

Uganda  and  Rwanda  qualify for the final tournament, along with host Sudan.

Southern Zone

First round

|}

Zambia receive bye to Second Round.

Second round

|}

Angola, South Africa and Zimbabwe qualify for the final tournament.

Qualified

 - Host (Central-East Zone)
 - North Zone
 - North Zone
 - Zone West A
 - Zone West A
 - Zone West B
 - Zone West B
 - Zone West B
 - Central Zone
 - Central Zone
 - Central Zone
 - Central-East Zone
 - Central-East Zone
 - Southern Zone
 South Africa - Southern Zone
 - Southern Zone

References

African Nations Championship qualification
Qualification
Qual